Parque El Ejido is a park located along Avenue Patria in the Old Centre part of Quito, Ecuador. It is the third-largest park in the city. Estadio El Ejido is located nearby. The park hosts exhibitions on the weekend.

References

Parks in Quito